Kenneth Peet Clark (23 February 1883 – 3 February 1965) was an Australian rules footballer who played with Geelong in the Victorian Football League (VFL).

Notes

External links 

1883 births
1965 deaths
Australian rules footballers from Victoria (Australia)
Geelong Football Club players